The Roland DJ-70 is a 16-bit linear A/D Conversion & 20-bit linear D/A Conversion sampling workstation and was released in 1992 by Roland Italy.

Roland DJ-70MKII
The Roland DJ-70MKII was released in 1996 by Roland Italy. It had 37 keys, 8 Play Pads (Pitchbender Joystick and featured the first ever for DJ's a Special Scratch Dial/Scratch Pad), 24 Voice Note Polyphony, 8 Track music sequencer, with RPS/BPM Function and featured a 3.5"in. floppy disk drive (2DD/2HD), "Load-While-Play" feature, SCSI port only on Roland DJ-70MKII. It also had a large backlit LCD screen. The Roland DJ-70MKII with its more powerful features then the Roland DJ-70, was essentially a Roland S-760 rack mount sampler with a keyboard.

Sample Rate
Up to 32 samples can be recorded. The Sampling Frequency Rates can be used are 16-bit 22.05 kHz or 44.1 kHz. Roland DJ-70 & Roland DJ-70MKII both can read on 3.5" floppy disk drive (2DD/2HD) file from Roland S-50 Sampling Keyboard, Roland W-30 Sampling Keyboard, Roland S330/S550/SP-700/S770/S750/S760 rack mount sampler (Using CONVERT LOAD feature). AKAI S1000/1100 sounds via 'SCSI port (Roland DJ-70MKII only)'.

Roland DJ-70:

• Memory 2MB [Sample Time: 22.5 sec.(44.1 kHz) Stereo. 45 sec.(22.05 kHz) Mono.]

• Memory 4MB [Sample Time: 45.3 sec.(44.1 kHz) Stereo. 90 sec.(22.05 kHz) Mono.]

Roland DJ-70MKII:

• Memory 2MB [Sample Time: 22.5 sec.(44.1 kHz) Stereo. 45 sec.(22.05 kHz) Mono.]

• Memory 32MB [Sample Time: 6 min.(44.1 kHz) Stereo. 12 min.(22.05 kHz) Mono.]

Both Roland DJ-70 & Roland DJ-70MKII use RAM Memory type, there are two slot available. Type used are (30-pin for MKI) 72-pin SIMMs Memories.

Display
Main panel features a 64 x 240 pixels backlit display LCD screen.

Notable users
Jean-Michel Jarre

References

Further reading

External links

DJ-70 PDF Manual Links:
 Online Roland DJ-70MKI/DJ-70MKII Owner's Manual & Extra Notes Location
 Online Roland DJ-70MKI/DJ-70MKII Supplemental Notes - May 23, 1997 Location

Other links:
 GREEN BOX: ROLAND DJ-70 AND MKII SAMPLING WORKSTATION - DEC. 02, 2017 (German to English Translation) by AMAZONA.de
 ROLAND DJ-70MKII (FaceBook Public Group Forum)

Polyphonic synthesizers
Digital synthesizers
Roland synthesizers
Roland
Workstations
Samplers (musical instrument)
Electronic musical instruments
Music sequencers
Sound modules
Music workstations
Hip hop production
Japanese inventions